Wakefield is a small-rural locality in the City of Lake Macquarie in New South Wales, Australia, situated 25 kilometres to the west of Newcastle.

The Awabakal people are the first people of this area.

References

External links
 Lake Mac Libraries: Wakefield

Suburbs of Lake Macquarie